The 1980 Appalachian State Mountaineers football team was an American football team that represented Appalachian State University as a member of the Southern Conference (SoCon) during the 1980 NCAA Division I-A football season. In their first year under head coach Mike Working, the Mountaineers compiled an overall record of 6–4–1 with a mark of 4–2–1 in conference play, and finished  third in the SoCon.

Schedule

References

Appalachian State
Appalachian State Mountaineers football seasons
Appalachian State Mountaineers football